Seven ships of the Royal Navy have been named HMS Captain:

  was a 70-gun third rate launched in 1678. She was rebuilt in 1708 and again in 1722, and converted to a hulk in 1739, finally being broken up in 1762.
  was a 70-gun third rate launched in 1743. She was reduced to 64 guns in 1760, and converted to a storeship and renamed HMS Buffalo in 1777.  She was broken up in 1783.
  was a 74-gun third rate launched in 1787. She was assigned to harbour service in 1809 and seriously damaged by an accidental fire in 1813 and broken up a few months later.
She was renamed HMS Captain in 1815 and was broken up in 1825.
She was renamed HMS Captain when she was reduced to harbour service in 1825. She was broken up in 1841.
  was a masted turret ship launched in 1869. She foundered in a gale in 1870 off Cape Finisterre.

References

Royal Navy ship names